Fred Cameron is a Canadian-American former soccer player who earned six caps with the U.S. national team.

Club career
Born in Windsor, Ontario, Canada, Cameron moved to Scotland to play soccer. On November 3, 1951, he signed with Aberdeen F.C.  He also played for Banks O' Dee F.C. In 1954, he played in the National Soccer League with Toronto Ulster United. The following season he played in the Pacific Coast Soccer League with Vancouver St. Andrews. In 1955, Cameron moved to the United States, settling in Southern California where he became a prolific forward with a series of amateur clubs.  Cameron played for at least two amateur clubs, San Pedro McIlvaine Canvasbacks and the Los Angeles Kickers.  McIlvaine won the 1959 National Challenge Cup title with a 4-3 win over Fall River S.C.  Cameron scored two of McIlvaine’s goals.  That year, Cameron was called into the U.S. national team where he was listed as playing for the Los Angeles Kickers Soccer Club.  In 1966, Cameron was with Orange County All Stars when they lost to the Ukrainian Nationals in the final of the 1966 National Challenge Cup.  In 1968, he played for the Los Angeles Soccer Club.

National team
Cameron played six times for the U.S. national team between 1959 and 1969.  His first cap came on May 28, 1959 in an 8-1 loss to England.  He did not play again for the U.S. until 1965, when he played all 1966 FIFA World Cup qualifying games.  All four games took place in March and the U.S. went 1-1-2, failing to qualify for the finals.  Cameron did not play again for the U.S. until a 2-0 loss in a 1970 FIFA World Cup qualifying game against Haiti on April 20, 1969.

Cameron later moved to the Philippines where he co-owned a resort in Zambalas.

References

External links
 
 

1945 births
Living people
Aberdeen F.C. players
American soccer players
Canadian soccer players
Canadian expatriate soccer players
Los Angeles Kickers players
United States men's international soccer players
Banks O' Dee F.C. players
Toronto Ulster United players
Canadian National Soccer League players
Association football forwards
Canadian expatriate sportspeople in Scotland
Soccer people from Ontario
Sportspeople from Windsor, Ontario